The following roads have been numbered 99E:

United States
 U.S. Route 99E (central California), Manteca to Stockton
 U.S. Route 99E (northern California), Sacramento to Red Bluff
 U.S. Route 99E (Oregon)
 Oregon Route 99E

See also
List of highways numbered 99W